Vahan Mamikonian (440/445503/510) was an Armenian nobleman from the Mamikonian family. In 481 he rebelled against the Sasanian Empire that controlled the eastern part of Armenia known as Persian Armenia. He was appointed as marzban (governor) of Persian Armenia in 485 and remained in that post until his death around 503-510.

Background
From 387 the kingdom of Armenia was divided into two zones of influence, Byzantine Armenia and Persian Armenia. In 428 the last Arsacid Armenian monarch, Artaxias IV, was deposed by his overlord Bahram V at the request of the Armenian nakharars, thus starting the Marzpanate period in Persian Armenia. Very quickly, the Armenians were disillusioned: in 449, Yazdegerd II ordered the nobility to convert to Zoroastrianism. The Armenians revolted under the leadership of Vardan Mamikonian, but were defeated on 2 June 451 (or May 26) at the battle of Avarayr; most nakharars who participated in the revolt were deported to Ctesiphon.

Youth
Vahan was born around 440 - 445. He was the eldest son of Hmayeak Mamikonian and Dzoyk, he had 3 younger siblings named Vard, Vasak, and Artaxias. His father was killed by guerrillas at Tayk in the aftermath of the battle of Avarayr. Vahan, along with Vasak and Artaxias, was captured by the marzban of Armenia and was deported to Ctesiphon; sentenced to apostasy, and was "weakened in their faith," according to his childhood friend and contemporary historian Ghazar Parpetsi.

The three brothers were sentenced to death, however, were released with the help of Mihranid prince Arshusha II. Vahan then regained his possessions, however, he was accused of misappropriation of income of gold mines, and had to pay a large sum of money to the Sasanians.

Revolt

In the aftermath of battle of Avarayr, the Armenians were constantly ordered by the Sasanians to go to distant military expeditions, mostly in Eastern Persia. They were also required to accept the growing power of the apostasy, which resulted in the revolt of Vakhtang I of Iberia (r. 447/449 - 502/522), and was positively received by the Armenians. Vahan hesitated to join the rebellion in 481, making Adhur Gushnasp, the marzban of Armenia, abandon Dvin and take refugee in Artashat.

Vahan then asked the other rebels to take an oath on the cross of the Gospel to remain faithful to the covenant he would proclaim as the new marzban of Armenia, and proclaimed Sahak II Bagratuni as the new marzban. However, Adhur Gushnasp returned from refugee with a force of 7000 horsemen against the insurgents, he was, however, defeated and killed by Vahan and his army at the battle at Akori (northern slope of Ararat), Vahan hitherto remained in Dvin to protect the capital, in early 483, Sasanian reinforcements came, however, Vahan managed to defeat them at the battle of Nersehapat in Artaz (region of Maku.)

Vahan then received a letter from Vakhtang, who was with his troops near the Kura river searching after the Sasanian army under Shapur Mihran. Crazed by the lack of promised reinforcements, the Armenians were defeated in 483 at the battle of Akesga that among other consequences, caused the death of Sahak II Bagratuni and Vahan's brother, Vasak Mamikonian . Vahan then went to Tao while Shapur Mihran was returning to Ctesiphon, allowing the Armenians regain control of the Arax river during winter. In the spring of 484, Shapur Mihran returned as the head of a new army and forced Vahan to flee to refuge near the Byzantine frontier, at Tao and Taron.

Marzban of Armenia
However, the death of the Sasanian king Peroz I in 484 in war against the Hephthalites caused the withdrawal of the Persians in Armenia and the recovery of Dvin and Vagharshapat. Struggling to suppress the revolt of his brother Zarir, Peroz's successor, Balash (r. 484-488), needed the help of the Armenians: in exchange for military support, he agreed to sign the Nvarsak Treaty, which granted religious freedom to the Christians and the prohibition of Zoroastrianism in Armenia, and included much greater autonomy for the nakharars. Vahan was also recognized as sparapet and the property of the Mamikonian family and its allies were returned.

During the same period, Vahan was appointed as marzban in 485, and appointed his brother Vard as sparapet. According to John I Mandacuni and Babgeno, Christianity flourished during his reign; churches were restored, and the church of St. Gregory was enlarged. Vagharshapat Cathedral was also rebuilt. The country enjoyed relative peace, despite the failed attempt of the successor Balash, Kavadh I (r. 488-496, 499-531), to impose on the propositions Nevarsak. In 489, Vahan along with Vachagan III, King of Albania, repelled an Hephthalite invasion of Transcaucasia. Vahan died between 503 and 510 and was succeeded by his brother Vard Mamikonian. According to Cyril Toumanoff, Vahan Mamikonian hypothetically would have been the father of Artavasdes, the father of Samuel I, who was a sparapet in 555.

Family tree

References

Bibliography

 
 
 
 
 
 
 
 

 

500s deaths
440s births
5th-century Christians
6th-century Christians
Armenian Christians
Armenian rebels
Vahan
Sasanian governors of Armenia
Rebellions against the Sasanian Empire
5th-century Armenian people
6th-century Armenian people
Christians in the Sasanian Empire
Armenian people from the Sasanian Empire